Lasionycta flanda is a moth of the family Noctuidae. It is found on the island of Newfoundland and at Goose Bay in eastern Labrador.

It was formerly considered to be a subspecies of Lasionycta leucocycla.

It is found on tundra.

Adults are on wing from mid-July to early August.

External links
A Revision of Lasionycta Aurivillius (Lepidoptera, Noctuidae) for North America and notes on Eurasian species, with descriptions of 17 new species, 6 new subspecies, a new genus, and two new species of Tricholita Grote

Lasionycta
Moths described in 1908